is a Japanese ice hockey player. He competed in the men's tournaments at the 1964 Winter Olympics and the 1968 Winter Olympics.

References

External links
 

1942 births
Living people
Japanese ice hockey goaltenders
Olympic ice hockey players of Japan
Ice hockey players at the 1964 Winter Olympics
Ice hockey players at the 1968 Winter Olympics
Sportspeople from Hokkaido